Khotkovo is the name of several inhabited localities in Russia.

Urban localities
Khotkovo, Moscow Oblast, a town in Sergiyevo-Posadsky District of Moscow Oblast

Rural localities
Khotkovo, Kaluga Oblast, a selo in Duminichsky District of Kaluga Oblast
Khotkovo, Oryol Oblast, a selo in Khotkovsky Selsoviet of Shablykinsky District in Oryol Oblast
Khotkovo, Smolensk Oblast, a village in Duginskoye Rural Settlement of Sychyovsky District in Smolensk Oblast